Paul Kemp (born 27 September 1930) was a Luxembourgian footballer. He played in four matches for the Luxembourg national football team from 1953 to 1955. He was also part of Luxembourg's team for their qualification matches for the 1954 FIFA World Cup.

References

External links
 

1930 births
Possibly living people
Luxembourgian footballers
Luxembourg international footballers
Place of birth missing (living people)
Association footballers not categorized by position